"Need to Be Next to You" is a song by American singer and songwriter Leigh Nash. It was released in 2000 on Miramax Records, East West Records, and The Engine Entertainment as the artist's debut solo single. It was released as part and as well as the opening track from the film soundtrack album Bounce: Music from and Inspired by the Miramax Motion Picture (2000) to accompany the Bounce film. It is a pop song that was written by Diane Warren and produced by Matt Serletic.

Track listing

Charts

Cover versions
 American country music singer Sara Evans covered this song on her 2003 album Restless. 
 British girl group Bellefire covered it on their 2004 album Spin the Wheel, under the title "I Need to Be Next to You".
 South African singer Nádine released a cover on her 2007 album As Jy Wonder and also released it as a single.

References

External links
 
 
 
 
 

2000 singles
2000 songs
Leigh Nash songs
East West Records singles
Songs written by Diane Warren
Song recordings produced by Matt Serletic
Songs written for films